Victor Jonson Benjamin Dethan (born 11 July 2004) is an Indonesian professional footballer who plays as a winger or attacking midfielder for Liga 1 club PSM Makassar.

Club career

PSM Makassar
He was signed for PSM Makassar to play in Liga 1 in the 2022 season. Dethan made his league debut on 23 July 2022 in a match against Bali United at the Gelora B.J. Habibie Stadium, Parepare.

On 9 February 2023, he came on as a substitute for Rizky Eka Pratama in the 64th minute and gave his first assist in a winning goal by Wiljan Pluim in PSM's 4–1 win over PS Barito Putera.

Personal life
Dethan was born in Kupang, East Nusa Tenggara, he has Canadian descent from his mother who also was born in Canada, while his father is from Kupang.

Career statistics

Club

Notes

References

External links
 Victor Dethan at Soccerway
 Victor Dethan at Liga Indonesia

2004 births
Living people
People from Kupang
Sportspeople from East Nusa Tenggara
Indonesian people of Canadian descent
Indonesian footballers
Liga 1 (Indonesia) players
PSM Makassar players
Association football forwards
Association football midfielders